The 2005–06 season was the 60th season in Rijeka's history. It was their 15th season in the Prva HNL and 32nd successive top tier season.

Competitions

Prva HNL

Classification

First stage

Second stage (championship play-off)

Results summary

Results by round

Matches

Croatian Supercup

Source: HRnogomet.com

Prva HNL

Source: HRnogomet.com

Croatian Cup

Source: HRnogomet.com

UEFA Cup

Source: HRnogomet.com

Squad statistics
Competitive matches only.  Appearances in brackets indicate numbers of times the player came on as a substitute.

See also
2005–06 Prva HNL
2005–06 Croatian Cup
2005–06 UEFA Cup

References

External sources
 2005–06 Prva HNL at HRnogomet.com
 2005–06 Croatian Cup at HRnogomet.com 
 Prvenstvo 2005.-2006. at nk-rijeka.hr

HNK Rijeka seasons
Rijeka